November is the second studio album by American artist SiR, released on January 18, 2018 by Top Dawg Entertainment. The album includes guest features from ScHoolboy Q and Etta Bond, with production coming from DJ Khalil, Saxon, and Andre Harris, among others.

Singles and promotion
The album's first single "Something Foreign" featuring Schoolboy Q was released on November 30, 2018, with the music video premiered on December 27. The song "Summer in November" was accompanied by a music video on the same day as the album's release, and the music video for "D'Evils" was released on May 4, 2018.

Critical reception

The album was critically acclaimed and received positive reviews. Pitchfork praised the album, giving it a 7.2 out of 10, claiming "Inglewood singer-songwriter and producer R&B isn’t just R&B. There’s a neo-soul silkiness to many of his songs, with an atmospheric, jazzy vibe in the production—November is an album for lighting incense, not candles. In this sense, he’s TDE’s answer to a moment that has seen acts like Daniel Caesar subtly returning to the genre’s more tender roots with great success."

Track listing

References

2018 albums
Sir (singer) albums
Top Dawg Entertainment albums